Calanthe pulchra is a species of orchid.

It is found in Laos, Thailand, Borneo, Java, Malaysia, the Philippines and Sumatra in humid forests at elevations of 130 to 1700 meters. It is medium to large sized, hot to warm growing terrestrial with close set, small pseduobulbs enveloped by leaf sheaths and carrying 5 to 6, elliptic, acuminate, plicate, gradually narrowing below into the elongate petiolate base leaf that blooms in the apring on a 20 to 24" [50 to 60 cm] long, erect, densely 40 to 60 flowered, racemose inflorescence with large, lanceolate, acute, very concave floral bracts that fall before the odorless flowers open

The small flower and hooked spur are diagnostic for this species.

References 

pulchra
Orchids of Laos
Orchids of Thailand
Orchids of Borneo
Orchids of Java
Orchids of Malaysia
Orchids of the Philippines
Orchids of Sumatra
Plants described in 1825